Lisa Solberg is a Los Angeles–based American artist born in Chicago, Illinois. Solberg is recognized for her multi-disciplinary and multi-dimensional art featuring paintings and installations. She has exhibited internationally with both solo and group shows.

Early life and education 
Growing up, Solberg was a competitive gymnast and in college took up slopestyle skiing. She subsequently competed as a professional on the national circuit for two years.

Solberg studied art at the Art Institute of Chicago as part of its Summer Studies program in 2001 and received her BFA at the University of Colorado at Boulder in 2005.

Artistic style 
Solberg has been praised by art critics for her large-scale abstract expressionist works and conceptual installations. She produces large-scale paintings, installations and immersive experiences with the aim to evoke emotions. As part of her work, she utilizes readily available materials such as rocks, wood, used drop clothes, tarpaulin, and styrofoam.

Work 
As part of Solberg's Stalker solo show, she debuted four-foot-by-eight-foot silver rectangles covered in etchings at THIS Gallery. The series was inspired by Rudolf Stingel's 2007 installation at the Whitney Museum of American Art.

In 2013, Solberg debuted 24HR PSYCHIC, a "ghost gallery" seeking to create a platform for discussion and awareness of self. It was open from December 2013 through February 2014 in LA's Arts District. This initial show was an immersive fishbowl experience where visitors could walk in 24-7 to reflect. Since then, the gallery has moved online and has been described by author Jenny Bahn as "morphing into a topical, meta take on the ancient practice of telling people their future–only this one comes via email with Beyonce GIFs and subtle appeals for self-empowerment." In 2016, Solberg took over Room 1111 at The Standard, Downtown LA for 24 hours as part of 24HR PSYCHIC.

Solberg has exhibited her Cry Wolf show at Munich’s Super + Centercourt Gallery. The show was inspired by nature and featured large tree trunks, paintings, drawings and mixed recordings of a river she painted next to with "the pieces examin[ing] Solberg's powerful experience of spending time in the woods, exploring both its beauty and its ferociousness."

Solberg was selected for the 2015 Summit Series Artist in Residency program. For this, she created Night Rider turning a snowcat vehicle into an art instillation at the top of a mountain in Eden, Utah.

In 2015, Solberg was one of the artists invited by the Mama Shelter hotel to create art inspired by their mothers. Solberg contributed fireworks as her mom loves them. The same year she was a part of MAMA Gallery's To Hide To Show group exhibition. For this show Solberg "took on an entire room (the darkness of 'To Hide') which included site-specific work created on floor-to-ceiling reflective stainless steel panels as well as drawings dispersed on several dark and dimly lit charcoal walls."

As part of 2015's Art Basel Miami, she undertook Mister Lee's Shangri-La, a project which transformed the Soho Beach House into a pop-up strip club. This exhibit was a personal piece that represented female power, mortality and potential. This exhibit was subsequently featured in Los Angeles at MAMA Gallery. The following year curator Ashley Sands invited Solberg and seven other artists to contribute to Someplace Else Right Now, an art exhibition staged in Frank Zappa's studio.

In October 2018, Solberg was invited by the Budapest Art Factory to spend one-month in Hungary to experience its art scene and develop new art. As part of this experience, she showcasedThe Writings on the Wall exhibit featuring installations made of found and repurposed materials.

References 

Year of birth missing (living people)
Living people
21st-century American artists
21st-century American women artists